Bilzen is a city and a municipality located in the   Belgian province of Limburg.

In 2021, Bilzen had a total population of 32,536. The total area is 75.90 km² which gives a population density of 426 inhabitants per km².

It was in 1977 that they all became part of the municipality Bilzen because of the fusion of municipalities.

Cities in Bilzen's neighbourhood are all within a distance of some 10 to 15 kilometers: to its north, Genk; to its east, Maastricht (Netherlands); to its south Tongeren; and to its north-west, Diepenbeek.

From 1965 to 1981 Bilzen hosted Jazz Bilzen, a jazz and rock festival that lasted several days. In its time Jazz Bilzen was the most important Belgian festival. Artists that performed there were, among many others, Humble Pie, The Moody Blues, Deep Purple, Black Sabbath, Humble Pie, The Kinks, The Troggs, Procol Harum, Golden Earring, Rod Stewart, Status Quo, Lou Reed, Aerosmith, AC/DC, The Cure, Toots Thielemans, Keith Jarrett and John McLaughlin. From the 1980s onwards the festival was superseded by Torhout-Werchter, that has now become Rock Werchter.

History
For over 300 years, Bilzen was part of the County of Loon.

Places of interest
 Alden Biesen Castle in the village of Rijkhoven.
 Munsterbilzen Abbey

Born in Bilzen
  (born 1973), composer, conductor 
 Elke Clijsters (born 1985), tennis player and younger sister of Kim Clijsters.
 Kim Clijsters (born 1983), tennis player.
 Valérie Courtois (born 1990), volleyball player
 Lisa del Bo (born 1961), singer
 Camille Huysmans (1871–1968), politician, Prime Minister (August 1946 – 1947); mayor of Antwerp (1933–1946).
 Jelle Vossen (born 1989), football player
 Thibaut Courtois (born 1992) football player

Gallery

References

External links

 
 Community Bilzen on Leesmee 

Municipalities of Limburg (Belgium)
Populated places in Limburg (Belgium)